St. Joseph Academy Catholic High School is a private Catholic high school in unincorporated St. Johns County, Florida (with a St. Augustine postal address). It is located in and administered by the Roman Catholic Diocese of St. Augustine. The oldest Catholic high school in Florida, it was founded in 1866.

History
St. Joseph Academy, founded in 1867, by the Sisters of St. Joseph, is the oldest continuously operating Catholic high school in Florida. 1874 marked the first “graduation”a class of 2! In 1876, the Academy was state chartered and in
1877 a boarding school for young women began. (It would remain until 1968.) A 4-story structure dormitories and classrooms
was built in 1909 to accommodate resident and day students.

In 1980, management of the Academy was transferred from the Sisters of St. Joseph to the Catholic Diocese of St. Augustine. The 1980 graduating class was the last from the original campus on St. George Street adjacent to the Sisters of St. Joseph convent. With the transition of management, the Academy relocated from St. George Street to its present site at 155 State Road 207.

School Profile
Saint Joseph Academy is a 4-year college preparatory school begun in 1866, and is the oldest continuous Catholic high school in the State of Florida. It is operated in the Diocese of St. Augustine. Saint Joseph Academy is located on the northeast coast of Florida in St. Augustine.

St. Joseph Academy accommodates up to 400 students with expansion planned to 600 students in grades nine through twelve.

Accreditation
Southern Association of Colleges and Schools Council on Accreditation and School Improvement (S.A.C.S. C.A.S.I.)
Member: National Catholic Education Association, Florida Catholic Conference and Florida High School Athletic Association (F.H.S.A.A.)

Curriculum
Saint Joseph Academy has a college preparatory curriculum requiring 19 academic units. Twenty-eight credits are required for graduation and a typical course of study would include:

 Theology - 4.0 credits
 English - 4.0 credits
 Mathematics - 4.0 credits
 Science - 4.0 credits
 Social Studies - 3.0 credits
 Foreign Language - 3.0 credits
 Life Mgt./Personal Fitness - 1.0 credits
 Practical or Performing Arts - 1.0 credit
 Electives - 4.0 credits

Honors Courses
 English I, II
 Science: Biology, Chemistry, Physics, Marine Science, Anatomy/Physiology
 Social Science: American Government/Economics
 Mathematics: Algebra I, Geometry, Algebra II, Pre-Calculus
 Foreign Language: Spanish II, III, ASL III

Advanced Placement Courses
 Calculus AB/BC
 Statistics
 Studio Art
 Studio Art 3-D
 Studio Art 2-D
 Psychology
 Government
 World History

Other AP opportunities may be offered through the Florida Virtual School.

Dual Enrollment Classes are offered through St. Johns River State College:
 World Civilizations 
 U.S. History 
 English Composition 
 American Literature 
 ASL 
 Marine Biology/Environmental Science 
 Spanish

Nearly 70% of students participate on athletic teams: Football, Basketball, Soccer, Volleyball, Baseball, Softball, Swimming, Cross Country, Golf, Track, Cheerleading, Tennis and Flag Football.

Grade and rank information
Cumulative grade point averages are based on semester grades. Class rank is based on all students and on all subjects. Honors, Advanced Placement, and Dual Enrollment courses receive an additional quality point.

Class of 2013 statistics
The Saint Joseph Academy class of 2013 was 58 students, who matriculated as follows:

Accepted to college			100% (13th consecutive year)
Percentage graduated with honors	76%
Florida Bright Futures			58%
Scholarship money earned		$3+ million
Community service hours			13,550+

Class of 2013 - SAT Composites

Class of 2013 - ACT Mean Scores

Notes and references

External links

 School Website

Catholic secondary schools in Florida
Educational institutions established in 1866
High schools in St. Johns County, Florida
Roman Catholic Diocese of Saint Augustine
1866 establishments in Florida